Ceremonial dancing has a very important place in the Indigenous cultures of Australia. They vary from place to place, but most ceremonies combine dance, song, rituals and often elaborate body decorations and costumes. The different body paintings indicate the type of ceremony being performed. They play an important role in marriage ceremonies, in the education of Indigenous children, as well as storytelling and oral history. The term corroboree is commonly used to refer to Australian Aboriginal dances, although this term has its origins among the people of the Sydney region. In some places, Aboriginal people perform corroborees for tourists. In the latter part of the 20th century the influence of Indigenous Australian dance traditions has been seen with the development of concert dance, with the Aboriginal Centre for the Performing Arts (ACPA) providing training in contemporary dance.

The Australian bush dance, which draws on traditions from English, Irish, Scottish and other European dance styles, is also a common community activity. Favourite dances include the Irish Céilidh "Pride of Erin" and the quadrille "The Lancers". Locally originated dances include the "Waves of Bondi", the Melbourne Shuffle and New Vogue.

The Australian Ballet is the foremost classical ballet company in Australia. It began in 1962 and is today recognised as one of the world's major international ballet companies. It is based in Melbourne and performs works from the classical repertoire as well as contemporary works by major Australian and international choreographers.

Indigenous Australian dance 

Traditional Aboriginal Australian dance was closely associated with song and was understood and experienced as making present the reality of the Dreamtime. In some instances, they would imitate the actions of a particular animal in the process of telling a story. For the people in their own country it defined to roles, responsibilities and the place itself. These ritual performances gave them an understanding of themselves in the interplay of social, geographical and environmental forces. The performances were associated with specific places and dance grounds were often sacred places. The body decoration and specific gestures related to kin and other relationships, such as to Dreamtime beings. Some groups hold their dances secret or sacred. Gender is an important factor in some ceremonies with men and women having separate ceremonial traditions, such as the Crane Dance.

The term "corroboree" is commonly used by non-Indigenous Australians to refer to any Aboriginal dance, although this term has its origins among the people of the Sydney region. In some places, Australian Aboriginal people perform corroborees for tourists.

For Torres Strait Islander people, singing and dancing is their "literature" – "the most important aspect of Torres Strait lifestyle. The Torres Strait Islanders preserve and present their oral history through songs and dances;...the dances act as illustrative material and, of course, the dancer himself [sic] is the storyteller" (Ephraim Bani, 1979). There are many songs about the weather; others about the myths and legends; life in the sea and totemic gods; and about important events. "The dancing and its movements express the songs and acts as the illustrative material".

20th–21st centuries 

In the latter part of the 20th century, the influence of Indigenous Australian dance traditions was seen with the development of concert dance, particularly in contemporary dance with the National Aboriginal and Islander Skills Development Association (established 1975) and the Aboriginal Centre for the Performing Arts (ACPA, founded 1997) providing training to Indigenous Australians in dance, and the Bangarra Dance Theatre (founded 1989). With a new sense of pride emerging in a number of Aboriginal organisations in Redfern, Sydney, the Aboriginal Dance Theatre Redfern (ADTR) was established in 1979.

The establishment of National Aboriginal Dance Council Australia (NADCA, also referred to as National Aboriginal Dance Council of Australia) was instigated by Christine Donnelly and ADTR in 1995. It was supported by Ausdance in their presentation of the presentation of three major Indigenous dance conferences. The second one was held in Adelaide in 1997, where cultural and intellectual property rights and copyright issues for Australian Indigenous dancers were discussed, and included a free outdoor performance in Rymill Park / Murlawirrapurka. The third conference took place in Sydney in 1999, funded by the Australia Council. Both the 2nd and 3rd conferences were attended by David Gulpilil's dance troupe.

NADCA  was still in existence in 2007, when it was in the process of developing a document on "Cultural Protocols on Aboriginal Dance".

Other varieties of dance 

Bush dance has developed in Australia as a form of traditional dance, it draws on traditions from English, Irish, Scottish and other European dance. Favourite dances in the community include dances of European descent, such as the Irish Céilidh "Pride of Erin" and the quadrille "The Lancers". Locally originated dances include the "Waves of Bondi", the Melbourne Shuffle and New Vogue.

Many immigrant communities continue their own dance traditions on a professional or amateur basis. Traditional dances from a large number of ethnic backgrounds are danced in Australia, helped by the presence of enthusiastic immigrants and their Australian-born families. It is quite common to see dances from the Baltic region, as well as Scottish, Irish, Indian, Indonesian or African dance being taught at community centres and dance schools in Australia.

Still more dance groups in Australia employ dances from a variety of backgrounds, including reconstructed European Court dances and Medieval Dance, as well as fusions of traditional steps with modern music and style.

The Australian Ballet is the foremost classical ballet company in Australia. Its inaugural artistic director was the English-born dancer, teacher and repetiteur Dame Peggy van Praagh in 1962 and is today recognised as one of the world's major international ballet companies. It is based in Melbourne and performs works from the classical repertoire as well as contemporary works by major Australian and international choreographers. As of 2010, it was presenting approximately 200 performances in cities and regional areas around Australia each year as well as international tours. Regular venues include: the Arts Centre Melbourne, Sydney Opera House, Sydney Theatre, Adelaide Festival Centre and Queensland Performing Arts Centre. Robert Helpmann is among Australia's best-known ballerinos.

Baz Luhrmann's popular 1992 film Strictly Ballroom, starring Paul Mercurio, contributed to an increased interest in dance competition in Australia, and popular dance shows such as So You Think You Can Dance have featured on television in recent years.

The Nutbush 
The Nutbush is a classic Australian line dance—typically performed to the American song "Nutbush City Limits" by Ike & Tina Turner—was created in the 1970s disco era; it took off in Australia during the 1980s, and it is has seen sustained success to this day, including gaining viral popularity internationally through TikTok. A common way of first hearing the song is when schools typically make students dance to it as part of a physical education.

Major dance companies 
Those dance companies funded by the Major Performing Arts Board of the Australia Council and from state arts agencies are:
 Ballet companies
 The Australian Ballet
 The Queensland Ballet
 The West Australian Ballet
 Contemporary dance companies
 Australian Dance Theatre (Garry Stewart)
 Phillip Adams BalletLab
 Bangarra Dance Theatre (Stephen Page)
 Chunky Move
 Company In Space
 Dance Hub SA (previously Leigh Warren & Dancers)
 Dancenorth
 Descendance
 Expressions Dance Company
 Force Majeure (Kate Champion)
 Lucy Guerin Inc
 Mirramu Dance Company
 Phunktional
 Sydney Dance Company
 TasDance
 Youth dance companies
 QL2 Centre for Youth Dance
 Extensions Youth Dance Company
 Urban Ignition Youth Dance Company
Dance competitions
 (Showcase) Australian Dance Championships, established in 1994

Post-secondary dance education 
NSW
 Australian College of Physical Education
 Australian Dance Institute(ADi)
 Excelsia College formerly Wesley Institute
 Macquarie University (North Ryde)
 National Aboriginal Islander Skills Development Association (NAISDA)
 University of NSW (Kensington Campus)
Victoria
 Australian Ballet School
 Box Hill Institute (Centre for Performing Arts)
 Deakin University (Melbourne Campus, Burwood)
 Victorian College of the Arts (University of Melbourne)
 Victoria University (Footscray Campus)
 The Space Dance and Arts Centre 
Queensland
 Aboriginal Centre for the Performing Arts
 Queensland University of Technology (Kelvin Grove Campus)
South Australia
 Adelaide College of the Arts (TAFE SA), a member of the Helpmann Academy
Western Australia
 Western Australian Academy of Performing Arts (Edith Cowan University)
 Youth Ballet Centre of Western Australia

List of operating dance companies 
A-C
 Ambition School Of Dance
 Anything Is Valid Dance Theatre
 The Australian Ballet
 The Australian Choreographic Centre
 Australian Dance Theatre
 BalletLab (Contemporary dance company – Artistic Director, Phillip Adams)
 Bangarra Dance Theatre
 Blink Dance Theatre
 Buzz Dance Theatre
 Canberra Dance Theatre
 Chunky Move

D-M
 Dance Exchange
 Dance Hub SA (previously Leigh Warren & Dancers)
 Dance Works
 Dancehouse
 Dancenorth
 Descendance
 Expressions Dance Company
 Force Majeure (dance company) led by Kate Champion
 Igneous
 Kage Physical Theatre
 Mirramu Dance Company
 Move Through Life Dance Company
 Nunukul Yuggera Aboriginal Dancers

O-Z
 One Extra Dance
 Passada School of Afro Latin Dance
 The Queensland Ballet
 Raw Metal Dance Company
 Restless Dance Company
 Strange Fruit
 Sydney Dance Company
 TasDance
 Tracks Dance Theatre
 The Dance Collective
 Visible Dance
 West Australian Ballet
 Wu Lin Dance Theatre
 youMove Dance Company

Defunct companies 
 Aboriginal Islander Dance Theatre (1976–1998)
 The Australian Choreographic Centre (1996–2007)
 Australian Choreographic Ensemble (ACE) (1992–1998) founded by Paul Mercurio
 Australian Theatre Ballet (1955–1955)
 Ballet Australia (1960–1976)
 Ballet Guild (1946–1967)
 Ballet Victoria (1967–1976)
 Bodenwieser Ballet (1939–1959) founded by Gertrud Bodenwieser

See also 
 Helpmann Award for Best Ballet or Dance Work
 Australian Dance Awards

References

Sources 
 Dance in Australia – a profile by David Throsby, Professor of Economics at Macquarie University

External links 
 The Dance Collection, Performing Arts Collection, at Arts Centre Melbourne
 Ausdance : the Australian Dance Council
 , a directory of dance resources in the National Library of Australia and National Film and Sound Archive
 Australian Performing and Media Arts magazine
 List of Australian dance schools by state